Christmas in New York is an album by soprano Renée Fleming.

Music and release
The music is jazz-pop, instead of Fleming's more usual operatic material.

The album was released by Decca Records on November 3, 2014. It was promoted in part by a PBS broadcast led by Fleming on December 4 of that year.

Reception

The AllMusic reviewer commented on the sameness of many of the tracks and the diverse expectations of fans of various genres, and concluded, "In all this is a holiday release that is unlikely to disappoint, even as reactions may vary."

Track listing
"Winter Wonderland" (with Wynton Marsalis)
"Have Yourself a Merry Little Christmas" (with Gregory Porter)
"Silver Bells" (with Kelli O'Hara)
"Merry Christmas Darling" (with Chris Botti)
"The Christmas Waltz"
"Who Knows Where the Time Goes?" (with Brad Mehldau)
"Sleigh Ride" (with Wynton Marsalis)
"Snowbound" (with Kurt Elling)
"In the Bleak Midwinter" (with Rufus Wainwright)
"Central Park Serenade" (with Gregory Porter)
"The Man with the Bag"
"Love and Hard Times" (with Brad Mehldau)
"Still, still, still" (with Kurt Elling)

Personnel
 Renée Fleming – vocals

Guests
 Chris Botti
 Kurt Elling – vocals
 Wynton Marsalis – trumpet
 Brad Mehldau – piano
 Kelli O'Hara – vocals
 Gregory Porter – vocals
 Rufus Wainwright

References

Renée Fleming albums
2014 Christmas albums
Pop Christmas albums